The following is a timeline of major events in post-classical history from the 5th to 15th centuries, loosely corresponding to the Old World Middle Ages, intermediate between Late antiquity and the early modern period.

Overview
This timetable gives a basic overview of states, cultures and events which transpired roughly between the years 200 and 1500. Sections are broken by political and geographic location.

 Dates are approximate range (based upon influence), consult particular article for details
  Middle Ages Divisions,  Middle Ages Themes  Other themes

Early post-classical history

5th and 6th centuries some of the 7th centuries

7th century

8th century

9th century

10th century

Middle post-classical history

11th century

12th century

13th century

Late post-classical history

14th century

15th century

See also
Timeline of ancient history
Timeline of classical antiquity
Timeline of Christianity
Timelines of modern history

References 

Timeline
Middle Ages
middle ages